Moto Racer 4 is a racing video game developed by Artefacts Studio and published by Microïds for Microsoft Windows, macOS, Nintendo Switch, PlayStation 4 and Xbox One.

Reception

Moto Racer 4 received "generally unfavorable" reviews, according to review aggregator Metacritic.

References

External links

2016 video games
Microïds games
Motorcycle video games
Multiplayer and single-player video games
MacOS games
PlayStation 4 games
PlayStation VR games
Racing video games
Video games developed in France
Windows games
Xbox One games